Hanes Mall is a shopping mall located off I-40 on Silas Creek Parkway between Stratford Road and Hanes Mall Boulevard in Winston-Salem, North Carolina. Hanes Mall Boulevard, the road named after the mall, has become a very high traffic count area with over 250 businesses stretching over 2.9 miles. The mall has  GLA and has 3 anchor stores and over 170 tenants in all. The mall's anchor stores are Belk, Dillard's, and JCPenney. There are 2 vacant anchor stores that were last occupied by Macy's and Sears.

Hanes Mall was North Carolina's largest  enclosed shopping mall until 2004 when SouthPark Mall in Charlotte finished its expansion project.

History
The original mall, the north wing, was opened in 1975 with Belk, JCPenney and Sears. In 1990, a new wing was built, expanding the mall southward to include Ivey's (this store was signed as Ivey's but, due to an acquisition by the parent company, opened as Dillard's), Thalhimer's (converted to Hecht's in 1992, and to Macy's in 2006) and a new food court. 

Because of this design, one must go through JCPenney to cross from one wing to the other. In addition, the mall is built into the side of the hill; patrons enter through the first floor on the south side of the mall, but must enter on the second floor on the north side. Hanes Mall is two stories throughout, with the exception of Belk and the former Macy's, which each have an additional floor.

Also around the same time a new four-lane boulevard named after the mall was built giving those who are residents or driving through Winston-Salem new ways to get new development and in 1992 when a new bypass carrying Interstate 40 was finished. A new half diamond interchange connecting Hanes Mall Boulevard to the new freeway was also constructed.

The road that loops the mall's parking lot is known as Hanes Mall Circle and is the address for many outlying businesses. There are five roadway entrances into the mall parking lot, one off of Silas Creek Parkway, two off of Hanes Mall Boulevard, and two off of Stratford Road. Hanes Mall also had a four-screen General Cinema movie theater until October 10, 2000; it stood at the spot that is now home to the Texas Roadhouse restaurant. Golden Corral is in what used to be the parking lot next to the theater. Golden Corral has the theater's old address which is 180 Hanes Mall Circle. The theater closed after the lease ended. The theater was at Hanes Mall for 25 years and was one of the original buildings at the mall.

A large, working carousel is located on the lower level. The mall is currently owned and operated by CBL & Associates Properties, Inc.

An H&M store opened in November, 2011. This was the second store to open in the Carolinas, the first being in Raleigh.

On November 8, 2018, it was announced that Sears would be closing as part of a plan to close 40 stores nationwide. The store closed in February 2019. Sears was one of the original tenants that opened with the mall.

On January 8, 2020, it was announced that Macy’s would also be closing as part of a plan to close 29 stores nationwide. The store closed in March 2020.

References

External links

CBL & Associates Properties, Inc. 

Shopping malls in North Carolina
Shopping malls established in 1975
CBL Properties
Buildings and structures in Winston-Salem, North Carolina
Economy of Winston-Salem, North Carolina
Tourist attractions in Winston-Salem, North Carolina